Ernesto Gauna (29 November 1950 – 1 November 2016), known professionally as Pocho La Pantera (Spanish: Pocho the Panther), was an Argentine master of ceremonies, actor, singer of Argentine cumbia, and author of successes such as El hijo de Cuca (1990), Me dicen la pantera (1991) and El paso de la fiesta (2016).

Biography 
In addition to his musical work, Gauna, born in Buenos Aires and raised in Córdoba, performed in various activities throughout his life, from his beginnings as a student of theology in Australia until his appearances as an actor in various series, both in television series and online and offline.

He took his first steps in music in the 1980s. He wrote songs such as "El hijo de Cuca", "Bailando con la gorda", "A mover el esqueleto", "La arañita", "Señorita diga quien es", "Cantinero le bajo la caña", "Me dicen la pantera", "Comprale un choripan", among many others.

His confession to his drug addiction and his eternal struggle with this problem determined, for several years on television media, his image. In 2015, photographs of him naked with tanned skin became popular on the internet and WhatsApp among young audiences.

A convert to evangelicalism, he married Viviana Basilia («La Griega»).  Pastor Giménez, one of the best-known Evangelical pastors in Argentina, officiated his wedding. Although his passage by the Evangelical Church was rather short, he managed to record a cassette, two CDs and a video (VHS). In 2013, he recorded an advertisement for Pepsi company next to Argentine footballer Ezequiel Lavezzi.

He died in Buenos Aires at age 65 on November 1, 2016, as a result of renal carcinoma. He was hospitalized for a week in serious condition in the IMAC (high-complexity Medical Institute). On 21 October he published his last message on the social networking site Twitter:
"Recuerden esto: ustedes me dieron todo. Gracias por el aguante." (in English: "Remember this: you gave me everything. Thank you for the support.")

Filmography 
 2012: El vagoneta en el mundo del cine.

Television shows 
 2016: La peluquería de don Mateo.
 2015: Laten corazones.
 2006: Sos mi vida, protagonist with Natalia Oreiro.
 2002 - 2016: Pasión de sábado.
 1998 - 2002: Siempre sábado
Emitted by Canal 365 Series and Uno Visión.

Theatre 
 2013: Los Magníficos - With , Alcides and Pancho de la Sonora Colorada.

Discography 
Genre: Cumbia tropical
 Pocho La Pantera (P) 1984 American Recording
 Baila mi pueblo baila (P) 1985 American Recording
 Gracias amigos (P) 1986 American Recording
 El amo del tiempo (P) 1987 American Recording
 El último de... Pocho La Pantera (P) 1988 American Recording
 Arriba las palmas cantarando (P) 1989 Musica & Marketing
 El hijo de cuca (P) 1990 Magenta
 El espectacular (P) 1991 Magenta
 Super bailanta (P) 1992 Magenta
 La cuca que la tiro (P) 1993 Magenta
 Mi niña bonita (P) 1994 Magenta
 La leyenda continúa (P) 1996 Magenta
 Vamos Argentina (P) 2014 Akkua Managent
Genre: Christian ballads
 Se fue De La Rúa pero vos me afilás la ganzúa (Plena crísis Argentina, 2001)
 Mi niña bonita (2002)
 Pocho León De Juda (música cristiana) (Paraíso Record, 2005).
 Con una mano en el corazón (música cristiana) (Producciones Peniel)
 A Cara Y Cruz (música cristiana) (Phono Disc Record)
 A Mi Manguera... Gracias Por El Aguante (De la Buena Estrella, 2011)
 Me dicen el transgresor de la teoría existencialista (De la Buena Estrella, 2011)
 Martes, no te cases ni te embarques (Boeri Record, 2012)

Other CDs 
 Boca Campeón (1990) with Isabelita
 Top 10 Vol. 2 (1991): El gallito ciego
 Increíble (1991): El descuartetizador, Que piña que tiene Pedro y La foto del cassette
 Increíble Vol. 2 (1991): Mil horas y No se vivir si tu no estas

Videos 
 VHS - Pocho La Pantera - Tiempos De Cambio
 Back the siam - Pocho La Pantera como el mismo- Película
 Pocho La Pantera - El Paso De La Fiesta - Todos Tenemos Uno

References 

1950 births
2016 deaths
Argentine male film actors
Argentine male stage actors
Argentine male television actors
Deaths from cancer in Argentina
Deaths from kidney cancer
Musicians from Buenos Aires
Argentine evangelicals